Tiede may refer to:

 Tiede, a Finnish popular science magazine
 Bernie Tiede (born 1958), American mortician and murderer
 Herbert Tiede (1915–1987),  German actor
 Tiede Herrema (1921–2020), Dutch businessman